is a Japanese manga series written and illustrated by Tomo Takeuchi. It tells the prototypical story of an aimless Japanese youth named Tatara Fujita, who, after a chance encounter, is plunged into the world of competitive dancing. An anime television series adaptation by Production I.G was broadcast from July to December 2017.

In North America, the manga has been licensed for English language release by Kodansha Comics.

Plot
Third-year middle school student Tatara Fujita is a guy who has no plans for his future or dreams, but tries to find something he can pursue for his whole life. With him being bullied and extorted, he is saved from delinquents by a man named Kaname Sengoku, a motorcycle-riding dance instructor. Tatara is entered into the Ogasawara Dance Studio in which he is shown the ropes of the world of Competitive Ballroom Dancing.

Characters

Tatara is a high school freshman. In his third year of middle school he did not know what he wanted to do in the future, nor had a hobby. He accidentally entered the Ogasawara Dance Studio after Sengoku saved him from the delinquents, and becomes hooked with dance. While he is difficult to be taught with words, Tatara is good at duplicating dance moves he has seen. His current partner is Chinatsu.

A professional dancer and Shizuku's partner for 9 years, Hyōdō is a genius dancer who looks unmotivated at most times, but is serious when it comes to dance. His family owns a dance studio and his mother is the current coach.

A first-year high school student and Hyōdō's dancing partner. Shizuku went to the same middle school as Tatara.

A first-year high school student in Tatara's class. She is skilled at leading and is Tatara's partner.

A 23-year-old champion dancer specializing in Latin. He took Tatara under his tutelage.

A remarkable Latin dancer and a high school freshman. He always wanted to be Shizuku's dancing partner.

A junior high school second year and Gaju's younger sister and dance partner. She was temporarily partnered with Tatara after her brother Gaju decided to partner with Shizuku.

Tatara's rival and occasional training partner. His style of dancing can be described as elegant, strict, and "traditional" or old fashioned. He hides an insecure, sensitive, and overthinking personality behind his calm and contained persona. He trains under Marisa Hyōdō ever since he had a car accident. He becomes Tamie Idogawa's dancing partner.

Kiyoharu's mother and a dance coach. She is a highly regarded celebrity and trained her son and Shizuku to becoming elite dancers. She later becomes Tatara's coach when Chinatsu becomes his dance partner.

Owner of the Ogasawara Dancing Studio.

An instructor at Ogasawara Dancing Studio.

An instructor at Ogasawara Dancing Studio.

Media

Manga
Welcome to the Ballroom is written and illustrated by Tomo Takeuchi. The manga began in Kodansha's Monthly Shōnen Magazine in the December 2011 issue, published on November 5, 2011. The series went on hiatus in February 2016 due to the author's poor health, but returned in the February 2017 issue. The series went on another hiatus for two months from December 2017 due to the author's health, however, did not return during the expected timeframe, and was instead expected to return in April 2018, but due to further health issues, the manga remained on hiatus until further notice. On May 13, 2019, it was announced that Takeuchi was preparing to resume working on the manga, later announcing in the July 2019 issue of Monthly Shōnen Magazine that the series would return on July 5, 2019. In the February 2020 issue of Monthly Shōnen Magazine published on January 6, 2020, it was announced the series would be on an indefinite hiatus due to Takeuchi's continued decline in health. The series later resumed in the August 2020 issue of Monthly Shōnen Magazine published in July 2020, but took a one-month break in the November 2020 issue published in October 2020 due to "establishment of a new system and the replacement of assistants".

In March 2016, Kodansha Comics announced the English language release of the manga.

Volume list

Anime
It was announced in the February 2017 issue of the Monthly Shōnen Magazine that the series would receive an anime television series adaptation. The series is directed by Yoshimi Itazu and written by Kenichi Suemitsu, with animation produced by Production I.G, character designs by Takahiro Kishida and music composed by Yuki Hayashi. Tetsuya Kinoshita produced the anime. It had its world premiere at the 2017 Anime Expo on July 2, 2017, later premiering on MBS and other channels on July 8, 2017. From episodes 1-11, Unison Square Garden performed the opening theme song "10% Roll, 10% Romance" (originally "Chandelier Waltz"), while Mikako Komatsu performed the ending theme song "Maybe the next waltz." From episode 12 onwards, the opening theme song was "Invisible Sensation" by Unison Square Garden while the ending theme song is "Swing heart direction" by Mikako Komatsu. Amazon began streaming the anime series on their now-defunct Anime Strike service in U.S. and on Amazon Video worldwide one day before the first episode aired in Japan, with the following episodes streamed as soon as they aired in Japan. The series ran for 24 episodes. Anime Limited announced that they had acquired the series for release in the United Kingdom and Ireland.

Episode list

Reception
It was nominated for the 6th Manga Taishō. It was number nine on the 2013 Kono Manga ga Sugoi! Top 20 Manga for Male Readers survey. It was placed seventh in Zenkoku Shotenin ga Eranda Osusume Comic 2013, a 2013 ranking of the top 15 manga recommended by Japanese bookstores. It is nominated for the 8th Manga Taishō. Volume 4 sold 53,892 copies in the week of April 14 to 20, 2013.

Note

References

External links
  at Monthly Shōnen Magazine 
  
 
 

2017 anime television series debuts
Anime series based on manga
Anime Strike
Comedy anime and manga
Dance in anime and manga
Dancesport
Kodansha manga
Production I.G
Shōnen manga
Sports anime and manga